This is a list of content libraries and catalogs owned by Amazon’s MGM Holdings.

MGM's pre-May 1986 library is currently owned by Warner Bros. (via Turner Entertainment Co.), a subsidiary of Warner Bros. Discovery, with few exceptions including Babes in Toyland, Flipper and Fame (still owned by MGM, via Orion Pictures for Babes in Toyland and Flipper).

Content libraries

Metro-Goldwyn-Mayer

Film Production/Distribution and Home Entertainment 
 Post-April 1986 MGM films (except Willow, owned by The Walt Disney Company via Lucasfilm)
 Metro-Goldwyn-Mayer Animation (not to be confused with the MGM Cartoons catalog, which is currently owned by Warner Bros., via Turner Entertainment Co.)
 The Cannon Group, Inc.
 American Cinema Productions

Television 
 MGM Television catalog (post-1985)
 MGM+ Studios
 UAMG Content
 Gato Grande Productions
 Evolution Media
 Lightworkers Media
 Orion Television
Filmways Television 
 United Artists Television, except Popeye the Sailor (under license from King Features Entertainment), the pre-1950 Warner Bros. catalog and the three Gilligan's Island series owned by Warner Bros. (via Turner Entertainment Co.)
 Ziv Television Programs
 International distribution rights to most 1973-2004 NBC Studios television series and specials

United Artists

 United Artists (except for most of their pre-1952 films, which are owned by numerous third-party companies), including:
 Ancillary rights to 187 Monogram Pictures films released from 1931 to 1946 (many post-1941 films still copyrighted to MGM)
 International Pictures
 Eagle-Lion Films

Orion Pictures

 Post-1982 Orion Pictures catalog, including:
 Filmways
 American International Pictures
 Sigma III Corporation
 Motion Picture Corporation of America (pre-1999 films)
 MCEG Sterling Entertainment, including:
 Intercontinental Releasing Corporation
 Manson Distributing/Manson International
 Moviestore Entertainment
 The Samuel Goldwyn Company
 Heritage Entertainment
 The Rank Organization (North American distribution)
 Gaumont-British Picture Corporation
 PolyGram Filmed Entertainment (pre-March 31, 1996 library):
 PolyGram Film Productions (29 films released between August 1990 and May 1996)
 Island Pictures, including:
 Island Alive
 Island World
 Atlantic Entertainment Group, including:
 Clubhouse Pictures
 Virgin Films/Palace Pictures
 Interscope Communications (The Tie That Binds, Two Much, Mr. Holland's Opus, and  Boys)
 CDR's Epic library
 Epic Productions
 Castle Rock Entertainment (home entertainment rights to pre-1994 films)
 Hemdale Film Corporation
 Sherwood Productions/Gladden Entertainment
 Nelson Entertainment
 Embassy Pictures (home entertainment rights to certain films, under license from StudioCanal)
 Empire International Pictures
 Vision P.D.G. International
 Trans World Entertainment
 Dino De Laurentiis Communications
 Fries Entertainment
 Cinecom Pictures
 Scotti Bros. Pictures
 21st Century Film Corporation
 Dimension Pictures

See also 
 List of MGM Television programs

References 

Metro-Goldwyn-Mayer
Metro-Goldwyn-Mayer